Rotorua Lakes Council or Rotorua District Council is the territorial authority for the Rotorua District of New Zealand.

The council is led by the mayor of Rotorua, who is currently . There are also 10 ward councillors.

References

External links

 Official website

Rotorua Lakes District
Politics of the Bay of Plenty Region
Politics of Waikato
Territorial authorities of New Zealand